Crepipora is an extinct genus of marine bryozoans belonging to the Ceramoporidae family. There are currently 18 collections from Belarus, Sweden, Canada, France and the United States (Missouri, Alabama, Ohio and Tennessee). It was first assigned to Cystoporata  by Sepkoski in 2002.  The fossil range is from the Middle Ordovician to the Upper Ordovician.

References

Cystoporida
Stenolaemata genera
Prehistoric bryozoan genera
Ordovician bryozoans
Paleozoic life of Nunavut
Extinct bryozoans